"Meat City" is a song written by John Lennon, released as the 12th and final track on his 1973 album Mind Games. The song is also the B-side of the single of the same name, and is included on the 2010 album, Gimme Some Truth.

Lyrics & music
Lennon began to write "Meat City" soon after he moved to New York City. The song began as a boogie entitled "Shoeshine" but by late 1971 it began to take its final form, albeit with improvised lyrics. A demo was made by Lennon on 10 September 1971, called "Just Give Me Some Rock 'n' Roll", while Lennon was recording the soundtrack to an unreleased film, Clock. By late 1972, Lennon had rewritten the lyrics and finished developing the melody.

Authors Ben Urish and Ken Bielen suggest that "Meat City" "has no deep meaning but demonstrates that Lennon could still fashion a perfectly fine rocker if he wanted." The first part of the song reflects Lennon's excitement over the vitality of New York, America, and rock 'n' roll, despite being repulsed by some of the city's madness. Music critic Johnny Rogan interprets some of the lyrics as a parody on jive talk as well as on American consumerism. As an example, he gives the lines:

Freak City
Chickensuckin mothertrucking Meat City shookdown USA
Pig Meat City

The second part of the song reflects Lennon's view of China, which to Lennon was "the next frontier" of rock 'n' roll, and possibly an opportunity to use rock music as a means of liberation, as Lennon discussed in a 1972 quote:

I shall go there. I will take the opportunity to try to see Mao. If he is ill or dead or refuses to see me, too bad. But if I go there I want to meet people who are doing something important. I want to take a rock band to China. That is really what I want to do. To play rock in China. They have yet to see that.

Lennon used some of the backward recording techniques from his Beatles days on the song. On the album version of the song, after the first refrain of "Just gotta get me some rock and roll" there is a "squeaky" vocal which when played backwards has been deciphered as "Fuck a pig." On the single version released in the US and UK, an alternative backwards message says to "check the album."

The song begins with Lennon yelling "Well!" in rockabilly style. However, the rockabilly style is not continued. Rather, the song is driven by a boogie riff described by authors Ben Urish and Ken Bielen as  "aggressive" and "funky." Authors Chip Madinger and Mark Easter describe the song as "an absolute cacophony of sound," suggesting that this is a welcome contrast to the "mellow" tone of most of Mind Games.

Lennon developed the riff for his later instrumental "Beef Jerky" by toying with variations on the music of this song and "Tight A$."

Critical reception
According to rock journalist Paul du Noyer, "Meat City" is a "satisfying" complement to the single's A-side "Mind Games." Whereas "Mind Games" is "ethereal and contemplative," "Meat City" is "earthy and physical." Author John Blaney sees evidence of duality within "Meat City" itself. According to Blaney, "Meat City" shows Lennon excited and disturbed by the "abandonment of reason rock 'n' roll could elicit from its audience." Although Lennon tested the boundaries of convention, such as with sex and drugs, he was disturbed by "total abandonment to hedonism." Music critic Johnny Rogan calls the song "playfully acerbic and thankfully rocking." PopMatters describes the riff as one of Lennon's nastiest.

Allmusic critic Stephen Thomas Erlewine considers "Meat City" to be a "forced, ham-fisted rocker." Journalists Roy Carr and Tony Tyler do not regard the song highly, but suggest that it is "rescued" by its "peerless unison guitars and jived-up beat."

Personnel
The musicians who performed on the original recording were as follows:

John Lennon – vocals, guitar
David Spinozza – guitar
Ken Ascher – keyboards
Gordon Edwards – bass guitar
Jim Keltner – drums
Rick Marotta – drums
Arthur Jenkins, Jr. – percussion

References

John Lennon songs
Songs written by John Lennon
1973 songs
Song recordings produced by John Lennon
1973 singles
Apple Records singles
Plastic Ono Band songs